Lognkosauria is a clade of giant long-necked sauropod dinosaurs within the clade Titanosauria. It includes some of the largest and heaviest dinosaurs known. They lived in South America and likely Asia during the Late Cretaceous period.

Description
Lognkosaurians can be distinguished from other titanosaurs by the wide and unusually thick cervical rib loops on their neck vertebrae, their extremely robust neck neural spines, the relatively narrow neural canal, and their huge vaulted neural arches. They also had very wide dorsal vertebrae with wing-like side processes, and extremely wide rib cages. Their dorsal side processes are also fairly in-line with the level of the neural canal, instead of being attached further up the neural arch as in lithostrotians.

Skull material from Malawisaurus, the sister taxon to Lognkosauria, indicates that lognkosaurians at least began with the big-nosed, rounded head shape of earlier titanosaurs and more basal macronarians.

Classification
Lognkosauria was defined as the clade encompassing the most recent common ancestor of Futalognkosaurus dukei and Mendozasaurus neguyelap and all its descendants. Malawisaurus may be related to this group. Lognkosauria has been found to include other giant sauropods, such as Puertasaurus, Argentinosaurus, Patagotitan, Notocolossus, Drusilasaura and Traukutitan.

References

Lithostrotians